was the mayor of Hiroshima from 1975 to 1991.

In April 1947, he was elected as member of the Hiroshima city council, and as member of the Hiroshima Prefectural Assembly in 1951.

Araki was elected mayor of Hiroshima in 1975. In 1976, he protested the air show held in Texas, in which the US Air Force held an imitation of the atomic attack on Hiroshima in the form of a mushroom cloud in the desert, and in 1977 protested to the Japanese government about the possibility of further such reenactments. As a mayor, Araki approached the US government to work for nuclear disarmament. On November 26, 1976, he held a meeting in Washington D.C. with head of Arms Control and Disarmament Agency Fred Ikle, a meeting attended also by mayor Yoshitake Morotani of Nagasaki with the purpose of promoting US policy of nuclear disarmament. On November 30, the two mayors met US Permanent Representative to the UN William Scranton and conveyed the same message. The two mayors met UN Secretary General Kurt Waldheim on December 3. Araki later described his meeting with Waldheim as follows:
There we, as survivors, living witnesses, testified the true facts of our atomic bomb experiences, and we strongly appealed for the total abolition of nuclear weapons and the renunciation of war.

To this appeal of ours, both Secretary-General Kurt Waldheim and President H.S. Amerasinghe of the General Assembly, representing the United Nations, respectively emphasized that the sufferings of Hiroshima and Nagasaki are sufferings to be shared by the whole of mankind, and that a new concept of world order should be built from the ashes of Hiroshima and Nagasaki. They deeply sympathized with us, expressing their earnest desire to visit Hiroshima and Nagasaki.

In May 1978, spoke at a special session of the United Nations General Assembly, dealing with disarmament, and was the first Mayor of Hiroshima to appear at an official UN session.

Being a hibakusha himself, he helped found the organization Mayors for Peace in 1982. He also concluded a number of Sister City agreements with Hannover, Germany (1983) and Chongqing, People's Republic of China (1986).

Notes

References 
 Appeal to the Secretary General of the United Nations 1976 Hiroshima-Nagasaki by Takeshi Araki and Yoshitake Morotani (New York, 1976)

External links 

Mayors of Hiroshima
1916 births
1994 deaths
Japanese anti–nuclear weapons activists
Hibakusha
University of Tokyo alumni
Deaths from pneumonia in Japan